Anderson's Pty Ltd v Victoria, is a High Court of Australia case that dealt with Section 90 of the Constitution of Australia. In this case, following on from such cases as Dennis Hotels Pty Ltd v Victoria, Barwick CJ accepted the broad approach to the definition of an excise, but rejected the formalistic criterion of liability approach for determining if the excise falls at the relevant step. He adopted the substance over form approach, or the substantial effects doctrine, in that there are many factors to be considered, for example, the indirectness of the tax, its effect on the cost of goods and its proximity to the production or distribution of the goods.

See also 

 Section 90 of the Constitution of Australia
 Australian constitutional law

References 

 Winterton, G. et al. Australian federal constitutional law: commentary and materials, 1999. LBC Information Services, Sydney.

High Court of Australia cases
1964 in Australian law
Australian constitutional law
Excise in the Australian Constitution cases
1964 in case law